Princess Chulabhorn Science High School , also known as PCSHS, is the name given to a group of science coeducation boarding schools that was established by the Thai Ministry of Education to honor science-oriented Princess Chulabhorn in 1993 when she was 36 years old. PCSHS focuses on developing the talents of students in grades 7-12 (secondary and high school students) in science, mathematics, technology, and environment to support science and technology professionals in Thailand.

School Name 
When the first 4 schools were established, This Ministry of Education (MOE) named that schools "Chaloem Phrakiat Somdet Phrachao Lukthoe Chaofa Chulabhorn Walailak Akkhraratcha Kumari", followed by name of school located province. In the late 1993, Princess Chulabhorn give the permission to adapt her royal cypher to be the schools' logo and give the new schools' name "Princess Chulabhorn's College", followed by name of school located province.

On August 6, 2018, MOE announces that Prince Chulabhorn give the royal permission to MOE to change the name of "Princess Chulabhorn's College" to "Princess Chulabhorn Science High School" on July 3, 2018.

School 
The PCSHS includes 12 boarding schools. They are:

Curriculum
Originally, the curriculum depended on The Ministry of Education but the schools' course of instruction was changed in 2010 by cooperation of Mahidol Wittayanusorn School (Public Organization), a Thailand science high school, and have used this curriculum since then. The PCSHS students receive scholarships from the government for study, food, accommodation, etc.

Symbols

The schools' logo is a crown cover letter “จภ.” (Jaw-Por). “จภ.” is the short version of the name of Princess Chulabhorn Walailak. The symbolic colors are blue, representing the Thai monarchy, a security-oriented, strict disciplinarian. And red-orange, which represents the traditional Thai color for Thursday, the day that Princess Chulabhorn Walailak was born (4 July 1957).

The symbolic tree is Spathodea (Thai: แคแสด). This tree has orange-red flowers that represent the symbolic color of the schools.

The school motto is “Moral lead academic matter”. It shows that the PCSHS students have moral principle to bring their knowledge to use.

PCSHS logo has been bestowed by Princess Chulabhorn on 6 December 2019. Designed by Fine Arts Department.

References

External links
Homepage of PCSHS Phetchaburi
Homepage of PCSHS Chiang Rai
Homepage of PCSHS Nakhon Si Thammarat
Homepage of PCSHS Pathumthani
Homepage of PCSHS Phitsanulok
Homepage of PCSHS Chonburi
Homepage of PCSHS Mukdahan
Homepage of PCSHS Trang
Homepage of PCSHS Satun
Homepage of PCSHS Loei
Homepage of PCSHS Buriram
Homepage of PCSHS Lopburi

Schools in Thailand
Science education in Thailand
Boarding schools in Thailand
Educational institutions established in 1993
1993 establishments in Thailand